The 2011–12 Guy Walmsley & Co Welsh National League is the sixty-seventh season of the Welsh National League. The Premier Division began on 12 August 2011 and ended on 17 May 2012. Division One began on 13 August 2011 and ended on 19 May 2012.

Premier Division

League table

Results

Division One

League table

Results

External links
Welsh National League

Welsh National League (Wrexham Area) seasons
3
Wales